Pseudo-Isidore is the conventional name for the unknown Carolingian-era author (or authors) behind an extensive corpus of influential forgeries. Pseudo-Isidore's main object was to provide accused bishops with an array of legal protections amounting to de facto immunity from trial and conviction; to secure episcopal autonomy within the diocese; and to defend the integrity of church property. The forgeries accomplished this goal, in part, by aiming to expand the legal jurisdiction of the Bishop of Rome.

Pseudo-Isidore used a variety of pseudonyms, but similar working methods, a related source basis, and a common vision unite all of his products. The most successful Pseudo-Isidorian forgery, known as the False Decretals, describes itself as having been assembled by a certain Isidorus Mercator (in English: Isidore the Merchant). It is a vast legal collection that contains many authentic pieces, but also more than 90 forged papal decretals. Pseudo-Isidore also produced a compendium of forged secular legislation pretending to be the laws of Charlemagne and Louis the Pious, under the pseudonym Benedictus Levita (Benedict the Deacon). Almost everything about Pseudo-Isidore's identity is controversial, but today most people agree that he worked in the archiepiscopal province of Reims in the decades before 850; and that he conducted important research at the library of the monastery of Corbie.

Historical background
Pseudo-Isidore worked in the second quarter of the ninth-century, in the archiepiscopal province of Reims. A likely candidate is an ordination of Ebbo, then archbishop of Rheims. His sympathies lay with the rank-and-file Frankish episcopate. Decades of royally sponsored church reform had contributed substantially to the prominence and political importance of Frankish bishops; it also contributed to their legal vulnerability, as the reign of Louis I the Pious saw a series of sensational episcopal trials and depositions. Pseudo-Isidore was also heir to a long tradition of Carolingian church reform, and his forgeries also include a wide array of themes reflecting Frankish liturgical, doctrinal, educational and administrative aspirations.

Content
One of Pseudo-Isidore's earliest projects addressed an authentic canonical collection from Visigothic Spain known as the Collectio Hispana (or the Spanish Collection), which provided a two-part compendium of canon law. The decrees of church councils were gathered in Part I, and papal decretals in Part II. Pseudo-Isidore knew only a corrupt subtype of the Hispana current in Gaul, known as the Hispana Gallica. He corrected this Gallican Hispana, in part by consulting related texts in other collections like the Dionysio-Hadriana. He also contributed an array of inauthentic interpolations to authentic Hispana materials, adjusting ancient legal proclamations here and there to fit his purposes. This so-called interpolated Hispana (also known as the Autun Hispana) survives today in only one complete copy, namely Vatican, Biblioteca Apostolica, Vat. lat. 1341.

At some later point Pseudo-Isidore forged a great many papal decretals in the names of popes from Clement I to Gregory the Great, which he then inserted into his interpolated Hispana. Sixty decretals from the earliest pre-Nicene popes (Clement through Melchiades) formed Part I of the new collection. Then came the conciliar material from the interpolated Hispana (originally Part I, now Part II), which received no further alterations. Finally came the original decretals part of the Hispana (Part II originally, now Part III), where many further decretal forgeries were carefully integrated with the authentic fund of Hispana decretals. This enormous compendium then received a preface in the name of the fictitious Isidorus Mercator. It is from this false Isidorus that the forger came to be known as Pseudo-Isidore.

The third major constituent of Pseudo-Isidore's output consists of a collection of forged capitulary legislation ascribed to Charlemagne and Louis the Pious. These False Capitularies, which consist mostly of excerpts from genuine biblical, patristic and legal sources, are false primarily in the sense that almost none of them were ever promulgated by the Frankish kings. Among the many genuine items are also select forged capitula that advance the Pseudo-Isidorian program. In a preface, the pseudonymous compiler, Benedictus Levita (Benedict the Deacon) claims that he found these neglected capitularies in the archives of the cathedral at Mainz; and that the former Archbishop Otgar of Mainz ordered him to collect this material for posterity. Because Benedict seems to acknowledge that Otgar is dead at the time of his writing, it has been possible to date his preface to the years after 847. Benedict presents his three books and appendices of pseudo-capitularies as an expansion to the authentic and widely known capitulary collection assembled by Ansegisus of Fontanelle.

Pseudo-Isidore also developed a small series of more minor forgeries which we find as appendices in manuscripts of the False Decretals. These include the Capitula Angilramni, a brief collection on criminal procedure allegedly given to Bishop Angilram of Metz by Pope Hadrian I; and a series of excerpts from the Rusticus version of the Council of Chalcedon.

Authorship
The names assumed by Pseudo-Isidore, including Isidorus Mercator (conflated from the names of Isidore of Seville and Marius Mercator), Benedictus Levita and others are all pseudonyms. The forgeries originated in the archiepiscopal province of Reims, where they were first circulated and cited. Thanks to the research of Klaus Zechiel-Eckes, it is now also known that Pseudo-Isidore did important research at the library of the monastery of Corbie, in the Reims suffragan diocese of Amiens. Scholars disagree about whether all of the Pseudo-Isidorian forgeries are to be attributed to the same person or persons; or whether the False Capitularies of Benedictus Levita and the False Decretals of Isidorus Mercator represent separate but somehow related forgery enterprises.

Zechiel-Eckes believed that the prominent theologian and abbot of Corbie, Paschasius Radbertus (abbot 842–847) was to be identified with Pseudo-Isidore; and that the earliest phase of work on the forgeries, amounting to a subset of the False Decretals, was completed in the later 830s. These theories once commanded wide support, but today they are increasingly disputed. Eric Knibbs has argued that older, traditional dating schemes, which placed the False Decretals in the 840s or early 850s, were essentially correct. Several decretal forgeries contain material that aims to justify Ebo in his episcopal translation to the bishopric at Hildesheim after 845. It has also emerged that the decretal forgeries incorporate many items from a mid-ninth-century Corbie manuscript of the works of Ennodius of Pavia, which would seem to preclude any dates for the decretal forgeries substantially before the 840s.

Manuscripts
Well over a hundred medieval manuscripts containing Pseudo-Isidorian material survive. The vast majority—around 100—carry copies of the False Decretals. They are traditionally divided into six different classes. Probably the most widely distributed version is the manuscript class that Paul Hinschius christened A1. Equally important, though much rarer, is the so-called A/B class, which was developed at Corbie, where Pseudo-Isidore also did his work. The B and C classes, available only in high-medieval codices, are derived from A/B. All of these classes contain the full collection of Isidorus Mercator in three parts. A fifth class, which Hinschius called A2, provides only the 60 decretal forgeries from Part I and an initial sequence of decretal forgeries from Part III; it is also known as the short version and is closely related to A1. Finally, Horst Furhmann identified a further class of manuscripts that he called the Cluny Version. This entire class is descended from New Haven, Beinecke Rare Book and Manuscript Library, Ms. 442, and it is merely an A1 subtype. All of these different arrangements of the forgeries actually reflect two different traditions. A1 with the so-called Cluny subtype and the shorter A2 version are all closely related to one another; the A/B version, with its B- and C- class derivatives represents a fundamentally different 'edition' of the forgeries.

The other major Pseudo-Isidorian project, the False Capitularies, survive in twenty-three medieval manuscripts.

Editions
Efforts to publish the forgeries have been unsuccessful, with the Hispana Gallica Augustodunensis never published. Although several editions of the Capitularia Benedicti Levitae exist, the most recent (Monumenta Germaniae Historica, Leges, folio II, 2, 1831) is scholastically inferior to the 1677 Étienne Baluze edition. The False Decretals and the Capitula Angilramni have been published twice, with the 1863 edition by Paul Hinschius criticized for his choice of manuscripts. Hinschius also printed the genuine and interpolated parts of the collection by reprinting older versions of Pseudo-Isidore's genuine sources, making that portion of his edition critically unusable. Historians must return to J. Merlin's 1525 edition, based on a single 13th-century manuscript and reprinted in volume 130 of Jacques Paul Migne's Patrologia Latina.

Influence
For 150 to 200 years, the forgeries were only moderately successful. Although a relatively-large number of ninth- or tenth-century manuscripts is known (about 100 more-or-less complete manuscripts of the False Decretals, dating from the ninth to the 16th century, have been preserved), the canonical collections took little notice of the False Decretals until the early 11th century.

During that century, the situation changed rapidly under the impetus of the Gregorian reforms and the Investiture Controversy. Spurred by monastic reform movements and the efforts of some Holy Roman Emperors, a group of cardinals and a series of popes strove to cleanse the church of abuses and free the papacy from its imperial patronage (which had recently freed it from the influence of Roman nobles). The reformers' efforts soon conflicted with temporal power; the bishops of the Holy Roman Empire were crucial to the emperors' power, forming the backbone of their administrative structure. This mingling of spiritual and temporal power was wrong, according to the reformers; Saint Peter had condemned Simon Magus (the "Simon" of simony), who tried to buy spiritual power.

The alleged letters, allegedly from some of the most venerable Roman bishops, demonstrated that the emperors' practice contradicted the oldest traditions of the church. Collections of canon law rediscovered the False Decretals, since some were largely extracts of the forgeries. The texts were now used to increase scrutiny of the bishops, making them dependent on the pope.

This situation prevailed until around 1140, when the jurist Gratian published his Concordia discordantium canonum (increasingly replacing the older collections and soon regarded as authoritative). Although Gratian also indirectly used forged texts, his work ended the immediate influence of the False Decretals. The texts had become a basis for procedural law, but the bishops' independence was increasingly restricted by the Church of Rome.

During the Middle Ages, few doubted the authenticity of the alleged papal letters. This changed during the fifteenth century, when humanist Latin scholars such as Cardinal Nicholas of Cusa noticed bizarre anachronisms (such as the claim that Clement I had based the preeminence of local churches on the presence of pagan high priests). During the sixteenth century, Protestant ecclesiastical historians such as the Centuriators of Magdeburg (the authors of the Magdeburg Centuries) systematically criticized the forgeries without yet recognizing them as an interconnected complex.

The final proof was provided by Calvinist preacher David Blondel, who discovered that the popes from the early centuries quoted extensively from much-later authors and published his findings (Pseudoisidorus et Turrianus vapulantes) in 1628. Although Catholic theologians originally tried to defend the authenticity of at least some of the material, since the nineteenth century no serious theologian (or historian) has denied them as forgeries.

References

Further reading
Blondel, David. Pseudo-Isidorus et Turrianus vapulantes… (Geneva, 1628).
Fuhrmann, Horst. (1972–73). Einfluß und Verbreitung der pseudoisidorischen Fälschungen. Schriften der Monumenta Germaniae Historica 24/I–III (1972–73).
Fuhrmann, Horst. "The Pseudo-Isidorian Forgeries," in Wilfried Hartmann and Kenneth Pennington, eds. Papal Letters in the Early Middle Ages. History of Medieval Canon Law (2001), p. 135–195.
Harder, Clara.  Pseudoisidor und das Papsttum: Funktion und Bedeutung des aposotlischen Stuhls in den pseudoisidorischen Fälschungen (Cologne, 2014).
Hartmann, Wilfried and Gerhard Schmitz, eds. Fortschritt durch Fälschungen? Ursprung, Gestalt und Wirkungen der pseudoisidorischen Fälschungen. MGH Studien und Texte 31 (2002).
Hinschius, Paul, ed. Decretales pseudo-isidorianae et Capitula Angilramni (1863).
Knibbs, Eric. "Ebo of Reims, Pseudo-Isidore and the Date of the False Decretals," Speculum 92 (2017), p. 144–183.
Knibbs, Eric. "Pseudo-Isidore's Ennodius," Deutsches Archiv 74 (2018), p. 1–52.
Patzold, Steffen. Gefälschtes Recht aus dem Frühmittelalter: Untersuchungen zur Herstellung und Überlieferung der pseudoisidorischen Dekretalen (2015).
Schon, Karl-Georg. Die Capitula Angilramni: Eine prozessrechtliche Fälschung Pseudoisidors. MGH Studien und Texte 39 (2006).
Ubl, Karl and Daniel Ziemann, eds. Fälschung als Mittel der Politik? Pseudoisidor im Licht der neuen Forschung. MGH Studien und Texte 57 (2015).
Zechiel-Eckes, Klaus.  “Ein Blick in Pseudoisidors Werkstatt: Studien zum Entstehungsprozeß der Falschen Dekretalen mit einem exemplarischen editorischen Anhang,” Francia 28 (2001), p. 37–90.
Zechiel-Eckes, Klaus. Fälschung als Mittel politischer Auseinandersetzung: Ludwig der Fromme (814–840) und die Genese der pseudoisidorischen Dekretalen (2011).

External links
 "Projekt Pseudoisidor" (older online edition-in-progress of the False Decretals, now discontinued), Monumenta Germaniae Historica. 
 The False Capitularies of Benedictus Levita, Monumenta Germaniae Historica. .
 "Opera Omnia" by Migne Patrologia Latina, with analytical indexes. 
 Pseudo-Isidore: An Edition-in-Progress of the False Decretals

9th-century Christianity
Canon law codifications
Forgers
Hoaxes in France
Unidentified people